The Syrian Air Defense Force (SyADF), officially the Syrian Arab Air Defense Force is an independent command within the Syrian Armed Forces. It is responsible for protecting the Syrian airspace against any hostile air attacks. The SyADF is one of the most powerful and combat-tested air defence forces in the region.

It has been merged into and then separated from both the Syrian Arab Army and the Syrian Arab Air Force. The Syrian Air Defense Force controls four air defense corps, eleven air defense divisions and thirty-six air defense brigades, each with six surface-to-air missile battalions. Since 2017, it has been linked to a joint Russian-Syrian command.

It is equipped with 650 static S-75 Dvina, S-125 Neva/Pechora and S-200 launchers, 300 mobile 2K12 Kub, Pantsir S-1 and Buk launchers and over 4,000 anti-aircraft guns ranging from 23mm to 100mm in caliber (e.g. ZSU-23-4 Shilka). There are also two independent 9K33 Osa SAM regiments, each with four batteries of 48 mobile SAMs. An unknown number of S-300 system were delivered to Syria in 2018. 

A large number of Iranian air defense systems were delivered to the country in 2021: Mersad, Khordad-3, Bavar-373 and Khordad-15 systems. 

The Syrian early warning system comprises Long Track; P-12 Spoon Rest; P-14 Tall King; H-15 Flat Face; P-18 Spoon Rest; P-30 Big Mesh; P-35 Bar Lock; P-80 Back Net; YLC-6 Radar; JY-27; JYL-1; PRV-13; PRV-16 Thin Skin; Alborz mobile and static radar sites throughout Syria.

Current structure and organization

 40,000 active personnel 
 15,000 reserve personnel
 Ten Air Defence Division HQ
 Thirty-three Air Defence Brigade
 One hundred and fifty Air Defence Batteries
Twenty-five defense teams (130 batteries)

Including:
 Self-propelled
 62 batteries:
 11 teams - 27 batteries - SA-6 Gainful (PU SAM 2K12 Square);
 14 Battery - SA-8 Gecko (PU SAM 9K33 Osa);
 12 Battery - SA-22 Greyhound (96K6 Pantsyr S1E);
 9 Battery - Buk-M2
 Towed
 11 teams - 60 batteries with SA-2 Guideline (CP-75 Dvina / S-75M Volga) and SA-3 Goa (S-125 Neva / S-125M Pechora) (Being upgraded);
 Two SAM regiments with SA-5 Gammon(in each brigade to 2 divisions for 2 batteries each).
 Four SAM battalions
 Eight Static/Shelter SAM batteries
 Two independent SAM Regiments
 Four SAM batteries with SA-8

Inventory

Combat history

In October 1973, the Syrian Air Defense Force (SyADF) shot down numerous Israeli warplanes using mostly the 2K12 Kub (SA-6) SAMs.

In 1982, Israel claimed that 19 of 20 batteries, consisting of five launchers per battery, each launcher carrying three SA-6 missiles, were wiped out in Operation Mole Cricket 19, and the SyADF claimed to have shot down 43 Israeli warplanes over Lebanon in the same year.
 
On 22 June 2012, the Syrian Air Defence Force shot down a Turkish McDonnell Douglas F-4 Phantom II reconnaissance jet. The jet's pilots were killed; both Turkish and Syrian forces searched for them before recovering their bodies in early July. The incident greatly escalated the tensions between Turkey and Syria.

In mid-November 2013, Turkish sources claimed the SyADF targeted, for ten seconds, three Turkish F-16 fighters that were flying near Dörtyol, over southern Hatay province after deploying from the Incirlik and Merzifon airbases. The incident came after a Turkish F-16 shot down a Syrian Mi-17 helicopter on September 16 after Turkey claimed it crossed into Turkish airspace in the same area.

On 17 March 2015, a US MQ-1 Predator drone was shot down by a Syrian S-125 missile.

On 13 September 2016, the Syrian Army claimed to have downed an Israeli warplane and a drone after an attack on Quneitra province. The Israel Defence Forces denied any such loss.

On 17 March 2017, the Syrian Armed Forces claimed to have downed an Israeli warplane after an attack on military site near Palmyra. The Israel Defence Forces denied any such loss.

On February 10, 2018, Israel launched air strikes against targets in Syria with eight fighter aircraft as retaliation for a UAV incursion into the airspace of the Israeli-occupied Golan Heights earlier in the day. Syrian air defenses succeeded in shooting down one of the Israeli jets, an F-16I Sufa, with an S-200 missile. The jet crashed in the Jezreel Valley, near Harduf. Both the pilot and the navigator managed to eject.

On April 14, 2018, the Syrian air defenses claimed to repel massive US, British and French missile strike on Syrian military facilities. Three civilians were injured, among civilians and military none. The SyADF used 112 anti-aircraft missiles, hitting 71 targets out of 103 (according to the Russian MoD). To repel the attack, the following complexes were used: S-125, S-200, Buk, Kub, Osa, Strela-10 and Pantsir S-1.

On the night of May 10, 2018, Israel launched a large scale air attack on multiple, alleged Iranian targets in Syria. After being engaged by the SyADF, the Israeli aircraft  attacked and destroyed a Pantsir-S1 launcher, as well as several other anti-aircraft systems (SA5, SA2, SA22, SA17) .

On September 17, 2018, four Israeli F-16s engaged targets in the Syrian port city of Latakia, to which Syrian air defenses responded. During the Israeli attack, a Russian Il-20 aircraft was mistakenly destroyed by an S-200 missile launched by the SyADF. All fifteen crewmembers of the Il-20 died as a result. Russian military claimed, Israeli Air Force pilots took shelter behind the IL-20, this exposing the Russian aircraft to the Syrian missile attack.

In February and March 2020, Turkey Air force F-16 fighters and combat UAVs launched airstrikes on Syrian Army positions in Greater Idlib region in retaliation for the Balyun Airstrike. Syrian Air Defense Forces stated they succeeded in shooting down 13 Turkish combat UAVs, including 7 Bayraktar TB2 and 6 TAI Anka.

On July 19, 2021, four F-16 fighter jets of the Israeli Air Force entered Syria’s airspace via the US-controlled al-Tanf zone and fired eight guided missiles at an area southeast of Syria’s Aleppo. Vadim Kulit, deputy chief of the Russian Center for Reconciliation of the Opposing Parties in Syria, claimed that seven missiles were downed by the Russian-made Pantsir-S and Buk-M2 systems of the Syrian Air Defense Forces. 

In the evening of 27 July 2021, a drone was launched by militants from the Kafer-Khattar community in the Idlib Province. The militant drone was downed over the Hama Province by the Syrian air defense who used a Russia-produced Pantsir-S missile system, Kulit claimed the next day. Syrian air defense forces shot down 22 missiles fired by Israel into Syria using Russian-made Buk-M2E and Pantsir-S systems, Rear Adm. Vadim Kulit said on 20 August 2021. 

Syrian air defense forces shot down twenty-one out of twenty-four missiles fired by Israel into Syria using Russian-made Buk-M2E and Pantsir-S systems, Rear Adm. Vadim Kulit said on September 3, 2021. Syrian air defense forces shot down 8 out of 12 missiles fired by Israel in Syria using Russian-made Pantsir-S systems, Rear Adm. Vadim Kulit said on 08.10.2021. Syrian air defense forces shot down ten out of twelve missiles fired by Israel into Syria using Russian-made Buk-M2E and Pantsir-S systems, Rear Adm. Vadim Kulit said on November 24, 2021.

On 13 May 2022, the Israeli Air Force launched attacks on SAA positions on Masyaf killing 5 people including one civilian, the attack destroyed one Pantsir-S1 system. On 25 August and 17 September 2022, new attacks were reportedly partly repelled by Syrian Pantsir-S1, Buk-M2E and S-75 systems.

Notes

Further reading
 Kenneth M. Pollack, Arabs at War: Military Effectiveness 1948-91, University of Nebraska Press, Lincoln and London, 2002, and Pollack's book reviewed in International Security, Vol. 28, No.2.

References

Air defence forces
Military of Syria
Syria